Paris Nogari (c. 1536–1601) was an Italian painter of the Renaissance period, a minor pupil of Cesare Nebbia active mainly in Rome. He painted in the library of the Vatican in a style resembling Raffaellino da Reggio and was among the painters who frescoed Santa Susanna and San Pietro in Vincoli in Rome.

References

1530s births
1601 deaths
16th-century Italian painters
Italian male painters
Italian Renaissance painters